Mochlotona is a monotypic moth genus in the family Geometridae. Its only species, Mochlotona phasmatias, is known from Australia. Both the genus and species were first described by Edward Meyrick in 1892.

References

Nacophorini
Monotypic moth genera